A garter is an article of clothing comprising a narrow band of fabric fastened about the leg to keep up stockings. In the eighteenth to twentieth centuries, they were tied just below the knee, where the leg is most slender, to keep the stocking from slipping. The advent of elastic has made them less necessary from this functional standpoint, although they are still often worn for fashion. Garters have been widely worn by men and women, depending on fashion trends.

Garters in fashion

In Elizabethan fashions, men wore garters with their hose, and colourful garters were an object of display. In Shakespeare's Twelfth Night, "cross braced" garters (a long garter tied above and below the knee and crossed between), as worn by the character Malvolio, are an object of some derision. In male fashion for much of the 20th century a type of garter for holding up socks was used as a part of male dress; it is considered somewhat archaic now.

Use in wedding traditions
 
There is a Western wedding tradition for a bride to wear a garter to her wedding, to be removed towards the end of the reception by the groom. This garter is not normally used to support stockings. This practice is often interpreted as symbolic of deflowering, though some sources attribute its origin to a superstition that taking an article of the bride's clothing will bring good luck. In the Middle Ages, the groomsmen would rush at the new bride to take her garters as a prize.

Today, the practice of removing the bride's garter is traditionally reserved for the groom, who will use either his hands or teeth, and then toss the garter to the unmarried male guests. This is performed after the tossing of the bouquet, in which the bride tosses her bouquet over her shoulder to be caught by the unwed female guests. According to superstition, the lady who catches the bouquet and the man who catches the garter will be the next man and woman among those in attendance to be married (though not necessarily to each other). The ceremony often continues with the man who catches the garter obliged to place it on the leg of the lady who caught the bouquet. Traditionally, the pair are obliged to share the next dance.

Use at high school proms in the United States
Prom garters were common in the 1960s and 1970s and often conferred on the date as a souvenir. If the date received the garter, it was typically hung from his rear-view mirror.

At least since the mid-2000s, it has become common in US culture for young women attending a high school prom to wear a garter, usually designed to match the style and color of the young woman's dress. The prom garter may be worn throughout the evening and is sometimes given to the young woman's date as a souvenir. A young woman may also choose to keep the garter rather than give it away, as a token of her prom night. In some cases, young people may participate in a "garter and tie" dance (often hosted by the high school as part of the prom), during or after which either the young woman herself or the young woman's date removes the garter and exchanges it for the date's tie. When the garter is given early in the evening, the young woman's date may wear it on their arm for the remainder of the evening. In areas where prom garters are common, it has become a tradition for young women to pose for a picture with other female friends before the prom in which they pull up the skirts of their dresses to display their prom garters, which are generally worn a few inches above the right knee. The giving or taking of the prom garter may or may not have the same sexual implications that are associated with wedding garters; however, the giving of the prom garter is often interpreted as publicly designating the pair as a romantic couple.

Suspenders or garter belts and stockings

Suspenders or suspender belts, also known as "garter belts" in American English, are an undergarment consisting of an elasticated material strip usually at least  in width; it can be wider. Two or three elastic suspender slings are attached on each side, where the material is shaped to the contours of the body.  The suspenders are typically clipped to stockings with metal clips into which a rubber disc is inserted through the stocking material effectively 'locking' the stocking in place.  These are normally attached to a length of elastic allowing for adjustment. These clips, also known as suspender slings, are best attached to stockings with a simple welt that do not have lace, or 'hold-ups' with a silicone rubber lining.

Suspender (garter) belts are usually worn at the waist or just slightly below to prevent the belt sliding down as it is pulled downward by the stockings. Some undergarments such as corselettes or girdles may come with suspender slings attached.

By the late 20th century and into the 21st, pantyhose or tights were more widely worn than stockings. And some stockings, referred to as hold-ups, have a band of latex rubber molded to the stocking top to keep them up without suspenders. But suspenders continue to be used by people who prefer stockings to tights, and doctors may advise patients with a history of thrush or cystitis to avoid tights; the trapped heat and moisture can exacerbate any infection present. People with a latex allergy must avoid hold-ups.

While most commonly used for regular stockings, suspender belts can also be used for medical support hosiery worn due to varicose veins or poor circulation.

Stockings are often considered to be sensual or erotic, both in person and in photographs, and some people enjoy dressing up for special occasions in attractive suspender belts or basques.

In ice hockey
Ice hockey players use suspenders for holding up hockey socks. As these socks are essentially woollen tubes, they need to be kept from rolling onto ankles. The socks can be held up by either hockey tape or hockey suspenders, which function like stocking suspenders.

History

18th century

Garters in the 18th century could be elaborately decorated and were sometimes embroidered with names, dates, mottoes or humorous phrases. Prior to the invention of elastic, they were fastened by buckles, or threaded with spiral springs to grip the wearer's leg.

19th century

Some women wore stockings with a plain elastic garter or narrow material tied tightly, not suspenders, or by simply rolling the top of the stocking, because it seemed more practical or they could not afford classic corsetry, thus creating a kind of predecessor of the modern hold ups. This was particularly common among servants and housemaids, particularly until the mid 1920s when the more modern suspender became readily available.

During the world's first long distance journey by automobile in 1888 Bertha Benz, the wife of the inventor of the automobile Dr Carl Benz, used a garter to insulate a broken wire of the Benz Patent-Motorwagen Nr. 3. In remembrance of this historic road trip today's official German scenic byway Bertha Benz Memorial Route follows the tracks of Bertha Benz from Mannheim via Heidelberg to Pforzheim (Black Forest) and back.  Stockings have also been used as an emergency replacement for a car's fanbelt.

20th century
During World War II, WAAFs were issued inexpensive suspenders.

From the 1940s to '60s, suspenders became a common, popular alternative to the girdle, especially among teens and young women. Amid concerns girdles might cause abdominal flabbiness, suspender belts offered a simpler, more practical, and more comfortable choice when used simply to hold up their stockings.

Since the early 1960s, many men's  magazines featured images of women in underwear, with models in suspenders and stocking, often with slips, petticoats, corsets or a bra and knickers or panties in erotic pose.
These images may have an erotic element and are sometimes presented as fetish fashion and also in pornography.

Contemporary practices
Suspender belts continue to be worn for their original purpose of holding up stockings.  Suspenders today are available in a variety of styles, most commonly in white, 'fleshtone' beige-pink, or black with a satin finish. These are often now made from a mixture of nylon and spandex / lycra, being more readily available in retail stores. Variations of the suspender or garter belt include knickers with suspender attachments reminiscent of images of the 1960s and corsets or girdles with small loops inside the bottom edge for attaching suspenders. Knickers are normally worn on top of the suspender belt as this makes it easier to remove them to use the lavatory / bathroom.  If worn underneath the belt, undressing may be rather complicated if using a public facility.

Order of the Garter

The Order of the Garter, which is the oldest and highest British order of chivalry, was founded in 1348 by Edward III. The Order consists of His Majesty The King who is Sovereign of the Order, His Royal Highness The Prince of Wales and 24 Knights Companions.

The origin of the symbol of the Most Noble Order of the Garter, a blue 'garter' with the motto Honi Soit Qui Mal Y Pense, is not known, as the earliest records of the order were destroyed by fire; however, the story is that at a ball possibly held at Calais, Joan, Countess of Salisbury dropped her garter and King Edward, seeing her embarrassment, picked it up and bound it about his own leg saying in French, "Evil [or shamed] be he that thinks evil of it." This story is almost certainly a later fiction. This fable appears to have originated in France and may have been invented to discredit the Order.

It is thought more likely that as the garter was a small strap used as a device to attach pieces of armour, it was appropriate to use the garter as a symbol of binding together in common brotherhood, whilst the motto probably refers to the leading political topic of the 1340s, Edward's claim to the throne of France.

The patron saint of the Order is St George, the patron saint of soldiers and also of England, and the chapel of the order is St George's Chapel in Windsor Castle.

See also

Sleeve garter
Suspenders

References

Medieval European costume
1930s fashion
1940s fashion
1950s fashion
1960s fashion
History of clothing
Belts (clothing)
Fashion accessories
Hosiery
Lingerie
Wedding clothing